Puerto de Anapra, (or Colonia Puerto De Anapra or simply Anapra) is a colonia in the city of Ciudad Juárez in the Mexican state of Chihuahua.  Anapra is west of the Rio Grande, on the border of the U.S. state of  New Mexico.  It is one of the poorest communities within the city.

The unincorporated town of Anapra, New Mexico, across the border in the United States, was incorporated as part of Sunland Park, New Mexico.

References

Ciudad Juárez
Mexico–United States border crossings
Populated places in Chihuahua (state)